Violet Ethel Mary Walrond (27 February 1905 – 17 December 1996) was a New Zealand swimmer who represented New Zealand at the 1920 Summer Olympics at Antwerp. She was New Zealand's first female Olympic athlete.

Biography 
Walrond was one of a team of four New Zealand athletes who competed at the 1920 Summer Olympics. At the age of 15 years 178 days, she was also the youngest swimming competitor at the Games. Walrond competed in two events at the Olympics. In the 100 metre freestyle race, she came 5th in the final (untimed) after placing 3rd in her heat with a time of 1:21.4. In the 300 metre freestyle race, she came in 7th (although New Zealand newspapers said she was 6th, and some publications said she did not start due to illness) in the final (untimed) after finishing second in her heat in 5:04.6. This was the only Olympics to have had a 300 metres women's freestyle race as it was replaced in 1924 by the 400 metres freestyle. She used the crawl style.
 
Walrond's father, Cecil 'Tui' Walrond, was also a swimmer. He accompanied her to the Olympics as chaperone and unofficial team trainer.  

Walrond and her younger sister Edna retired from competitive swimming in 1923 when Walrond was 18. She later stated that they retired on orders from their father, as he felt that we were too much in the public eye. He also forbade them from cutting their long hair short. 

She married Harold Robb in 1933, and died in 1996 aged 91, in Papakura, Auckland.

References

Further reading

External links

Photo and article 
Photo in group at 1920 Olympics

1905 births
1996 deaths
Swimmers at the 1920 Summer Olympics
Olympic swimmers of New Zealand
New Zealand female swimmers
Swimmers from Auckland